The economy of Serbia is a service-based upper-middle income economy in Central Europe, with the tertiary sector accounting for two-thirds of total gross domestic product (GDP). The economy functions on the principles of the free market. Nominal GDP in 2023 is projected to reach $72.587 billion, which is $10,850 per capita, while GDP based on purchasing power parity (PPP) stood at $175.318 billion, which is $26,205 per capita.
The strongest sectors of Serbia's economy are energy, the automotive industry, machinery, mining, and agriculture. The country's primary industrial exports are automobiles, base metals, furniture, food processing, machinery, chemicals, sugar, tires, clothes, and pharmaceuticals. Trade plays a major role in Serbian economic output. The main trading partners are Germany, Italy, Russia, China, and neighbouring Balkan countries.

Belgrade is the capital and economic heart of Serbia and home to most major Serbian and international companies operating in the country, as well as the National Bank of Serbia and the Belgrade Stock Exchange. Novi Sad and Niš are the second and third largest cities respectively and the most important economic hubs after Belgrade.

Historical preview
In the decades leading up to World War I, GDP growth in Serbia grew by 0.28% per annum. This was a slower growth rate than north-western Europe, leading to a widening economic divergence between Serbia and Western Europe. Prior to WWI, there was extensive growth in Serbia's dominant agricultural sector. However, industrial and service sectors remained small.

In the late 1980s, at the beginning of the process of economic transition from a planned economy to a market economy, Serbia's economy had a favourable position in comparison to most of the Eastern Bloc countries, but it was gravely impacted by poor economic decision making in the 1990s, the Yugoslav Wars, and UN sanctions and trade embargo during the 1990s. At the same time, the country experienced a serious "brain drain". There was a severe recession which continued until 1999. After the overthrow of Slobodan Milošević in 2000, Serbia went through a process of transition to a market-based economy and experienced fast economic growth. During that period, the Serbian economy grew 4-5% annually, average wages quadrupled, and economic and social opportunities dramatically improved. During the Great Recession, Serbia marked a decline in its economy of 3.1% in 2009, and following years of economic stagnation pre-crisis level of GDP was reached only in 2016.

Since 2014, the country has been in the process of accession negotiations to join the European Union.

Macroeconomic trends

Economic growth
The average growth of Serbia's GDP in the last five years was 4% per year. GDP structure by sector is: services 67.9%, industry 26.1%, agriculture 6.0%.

GDP - composition, by end use

household consumption: 78.2% (2017 est.)

government consumption: 10.1% (2017 est.)

investment in fixed capital: 18.5% (2017 est.)

investment in inventories: 2% (2017 est.)

exports of goods and services: 52.5% (2017 est.)

imports of goods and services: -61.3% (2017 est.)

Public finances
Serbia's public debt relative to GDP from 2000 to 2008 decreased by 140.1 percentage points, and then started increasing again as the government was fighting effects of worldwide 2008 financial crisis. In 2018, the public debt stood at 53.8% of GDP.

Serbian foreign exchange reserves were highly augmented from 2000 to 2009, when they amounted 10.6 billion euros and have stayed at that level ever since.

Currency and inflation

The official currency in Serbia is the Serbian dinar and its earliest use dates back to 1214.

Serbia historically has battled high inflation, especially during the 1980s and 1990s. In 1992 and 1993, it experienced a period of hyperinflation which lasted for a total of 25 months. In 1993, the monthly inflation rate stood at a staggering 313 million percent. Since the early 2000s, the inflation rate has stabilized and in the last couple of years a relatively low level of inflation was recorded.

External trade

Serbia has a wide range of free trade agreements with foreign countries and trading blocs.

Serbia signed a free trade agreement with the European Union in 2008 enabling exports of all products originating from Serbia without customs and other fees. For a limited number of products (baby beef, sugar, and wine), annual import quotas remain in effect. As of 2016, the EU countries were the largest trading partners of Serbia with 64.4% of country's total foreign trade.

Serbia signed the CEFTA enabling exports of all products originating from Serbia without customs and other fees to the neighbouring countries: Albania, Bosnia and Herzegovina, North Macedonia, Moldova, Montenegro and Kosovo. In 2016, the CEFTA countries were the second largest trading partners of Serbia.

Serbia signed a free-trade agreement with EFTA members (Switzerland, Norway, Iceland) in 2009.

The Serbian free-trade agreement with Russia was implemented since 2000; for a limited number of products, annual import quotas remain in effect. Free-trade agreement with Turkey has been implemented since 2010. Trade with the United States is pursued under the Generalized System of Preferences (GSP) with a preferential duty-free entry for approximately 4,650 products.

Foreign direct investments

Attracting foreign direct investments is set as a priority for the government of Serbia, which provides both financial and tax incentives to companies willing to invest. 
Leading investor nations in Serbia include: Germany, Italy, United States, China, Austria, Norway, and Greece. Majority of FDI went into automotive industry, food and beverage industry, machinery, textile and clothing.

Blue-chip corporations making investments in manufacturing sector include: Fiat Chrysler Automobiles, Bosch, Michelin, Siemens, Panasonic, Continental, Schneider Electric, Philip Morris, LafargeHolcim, PepsiCo, Coca-Cola, Carlsberg and others. In the energy sector, Russian energy giants, Lukoil and Gazprom have made large investments. In metallurgy sector, Chinese steel and copper giants, Hesteel and Zijin Mining have acquired steel mill in Smederevo and copper mining complex in Bor, respectively. The financial sector has attracted investments from Italian banks such as Intesa Sanpaolo and UniCredit, Crédit Agricole and Société Générale from France, Erste Bank and Raiffeisen from Austria, among others. ICT and telecommunications saw investments from likes such as Microsoft, Telenor, Telekom Austria, and NCR. In retail sector, biggest foreign investors are Dutch Ahold Delhaize, German Metro AG and Schwarz Gruppe, Greek Veropoulos, and Croatian Fortenova.

Economic sectors

Agriculture

Serbia has very favourable natural conditions (land and climate) for varied agricultural production. It has 5,056,000 ha of agricultural land (0.7 ha per capita), out of which 3,294,000 ha is arable land (0.45 ha per capita). In 2016, Serbia exported agricultural and food products worth $3.2 billion, and the export-import ratio was 178%. Agricultural exports constitute more than one-fifth of all Serbia's sales on the world market. Serbia is one of the largest provider of frozen fruit to the EU (largest to the French market, and 2nd largest to the German market). Agricultural production is most prominent in Vojvodina on the fertile Pannonian Plain. Other agricultural regions include Mačva, Pomoravlje, Tamnava, Rasina, and Jablanica.
In the structure of the agricultural production 70% is from the crop field production, and 30% is from the livestock production. Serbia is world's second largest producer of plums (582,485 tons; second to China) and the third largest of raspberries (127,010 tons, trailing only Russia and the United States). It is also significant producer of maize (6.48 million tons, ranked 32nd in the world) and wheat (2.07 million tons, ranked 35th in the world). Other important agricultural products are: sunflower, sugar beet, soybean, potato, apple, mutton, pork meat, beef, poultry and dairy.

There are 56,000 ha of vineyards in Serbia, producing about 230 million litres of wine annually. Most famous viticulture regions are located in Vojvodina and Šumadija.

Energy

The energy sector is one of the largest and most important sectors to the country's economy. Serbia is a net exporter of electricity and importer of key fuels (such as oil and gas).

Serbia has an abundance of coal, and significant reserves of oil and gas. Serbia's proven reserves of 5.5 billion tons of coal lignite are the 5th largest in the world (second in Europe, after Germany). Coal is found in two large deposits: Kolubara (4 billion tons of reserves) and Kostolac (1.5 billion tons). Despite being small on a world scale, Serbia's oil and gas resources (77.4 million tons of oil equivalent and 48.1 billion cubic meters, respectively) have a certain regional importance since they are largest in the region of former Yugoslavia as well as the Balkans (excluding Romania). Almost 90% of the discovered oil and gas are to be found in Banat and those oil and gas fields are by size among the largest in the Pannonian basin but are average on a European scale.

The production of electricity in 2018 in Serbia was 38.3 billion kilowatt-hours (KWh), while the final electricity consumption amounted to 28.1 billion kilowatt-hours (KWh). Most of the electricity produced comes from thermal-power plants (71% of all electricity) and to a lesser degree from hydroelectric-power plants (24%) and wind energy (3%). There are 6 lignite-operated thermal-power plants with an installed power of 3,936 MW; largest of which are 1,502 MW-Nikola Tesla 1 and 1,160 MW-Nikola Tesla 2, both in Obrenovac. Total installed power of 9 hydroelectric-power plants is 2,831 MW, largest of which is Đerdap 1 with capacity of 1,026 MW. In addition to this, there are mazute and gas-operated thermal-power plants with an installed power of 353 MW. The entire production of electricity is concentrated in Elektroprivreda Srbije (EPS), public electric-utility power company.

The current oil production in Serbia amounts to over 1.1 million tons of oil equivalent and satisfies some 43% of country's needs while the rest is imported. National petrol company, Naftna Industrija Srbije (NIS), was acquired in 2008 by Gazprom Neft. The company's refinery in Pančevo (capacity of 4.8 million tons) is one of the most modern oil-refineries in Europe; it also operates network of 334 filling stations in Serbia (74% of domestic market) and additional 36 stations in Bosnia and Herzegovina, 31 in Bulgaria, and 28 in Romania. There are 155 kilometers of crude oil pipelines connecting Pančevo and Novi Sad refineries as a part of trans-national Adria oil pipeline.

Serbia is heavily dependent on foreign sources of natural gas, with only 17% coming from domestic production (totalling 491 million cubic meters in 2012) and the rest is imported, mainly from Russia (via gas pipelines that run through Ukraine and Hungary). Srbijagas, public company, operates the natural gas transportation system which comprise 3,177 kilometers of trunk and regional natural gas pipelines and a 450 million cubic meter underground gas storage facility at Banatski Dvor.

Industry

The industry is the economy sector which was hardest hit by the UN sanctions and trade embargo and NATO bombing during the 1990s and transition to market economy during the 2000s. The industrial output saw dramatic downsizing: in 2013 it was expected to be only a half of that of 1989. Main industrial sectors include: automotive, mining, non-ferrous metals, food-processing, electronics, pharmaceuticals, clothes. Serbia has 14 free economic zones as of September 2017, in which many foreign direct investments are realized.

Automotive industry (with Fiat Chrysler Automobiles as a forebearer) is dominated by cluster located in Kragujevac and its vicinity, and contributes to export with about $2 billion. Country is a leading steel producer in the wider region of South Central Europe and had production of nearly 2 million tons of raw steel in 2018, coming entirely from Smederevo steel mill, owned by the Chinese Hesteel.

Serbia's mining industry is comparatively strong: Serbia is the 18th largest producer of coal (7th in the Europe) extracted from large deposits in Kolubara and Kostolac basins; it is also world's 23rd largest (3rd in Europe) producer of copper which is extracted by Zijin Bor Copper, a large copper mining company, acquired by Chinese Zijin Mining in 2018; significant gold extraction is developed around Majdanpek.

Serbia notably manufactures intel smartphones named Tesla smartphones.

Food industry is well known both regionally and internationally and is one of the strong points of the economy. Some of the international brand-names established production in Serbia: PepsiCo and Nestlé in food-processing sector; Coca-Cola (Belgrade), Heineken (Novi Sad) and Carlsberg (Bačka Palanka) in beverage industry; Nordzucker in sugar industry. Serbia's electronics industry had its peak in the 1980s and the industry today is only a third of what it was back then, but has witnessed a something of revival in last decade with investments of companies such as Siemens (wind turbines) in Subotica, Panasonic (lighting devices) in Svilajnac, and Gorenje (electrical home appliances) in Valjevo. The pharmaceutical industry in Serbia comprises a dozen manufacturers of generic drugs, of which Hemofarm in Vršac and Galenika in Belgrade, account for 80% of production volume. Domestic production meets over 60% of the local demand.

Telecommunications and IT industry

Fixed telephone lines connect 89% of households in Serbia, and with about 8.82 million users the number of cellphones surpasses the total population of Serbia by 25%. The largest mobile operator is Telekom Srbija with 4.06 million subscribers, followed by Yettel Serbia with 2.73 million users and A1 Srbija with about 2.03 million. Some 58% of households have fixed-line (non-mobile) broadband Internet connection while 67% are provided with pay television services (i.e. 38% cable television, 17% IPTV, and 10% satellite). Digital television transition has been completed in 2015 with DVB-T2 standard for signal transmission.

The Serbian IT industry is rapidly growing and changing pace. In 2018, IT services exports reached $1.3 billion. With 6,924 companies in the IT sector, Belgrade is one of the information technology centers in this part of Europe, with strong growth. Microsoft Development Center located in Belgrade was at the time of its establishment fifth such center in the world. Many world IT companies choose Belgrade as regional or European center such as Asus, Intel, Dell, Huawei, NCR, Ubisoft etc. These companies have taken advantage of Serbia's large pool of engineers and relatively low wages.

Large investments by global tech companies like Microsoft, typical of the 2000s, are being eclipsed by a growing number of domestic startups which obtain funding from domestic and international investors. What brought companies like Microsoft in the first place was a large pool of talented engineers and mathematicians. In just the first quarter of 2016, more than US$65 million has been raised by Serbian startups including $45 million for Seven Bridges (a Bioinformatics firm) and $14 million for Vast (a data analysis firm). One of the most successful startups have been Nordeus which was founded in Belgrade in 2010 and is one of Europe's fastest-growing companies in the field of computer games (the developer of Top Eleven Football Manager, a game played by over 20 million people).

Tourism

The touristic sector accounted for 1.4% of GDP in 2017 and employs some 75,000 people, about 3% of the country's workforce. Foreign exchange earnings from tourism in 2018 were estimated at $1.5 billion.

Serbia is not a mass-tourism destination but nevertheless has a diverse range of touristic products. In 2018, total of over 3.4 million tourists were recorded in accommodations, of which half were foreign.

Tourism is mainly focused on the mountains and spas of the country, which are mostly visited by domestic tourists, as well as Belgrade which is preferred choice of foreign tourists. The most famous mountain resorts are Kopaonik, Stara Planina, and Zlatibor. There are also many spas in Serbia, the biggest of which is Vrnjačka Banja, Soko Banja, and Banja Koviljača. City-break and conference tourism is developed in Belgrade (which was visited by 938,448 foreign tourists in 2018, more than a half of all international visits to the country) and to a lesser degree Novi Sad. Other touristic products that Serbia offer are natural wonders like Đavolja varoš, Christian pilgrimage to the many Orthodox monasteries across the country and the river cruising along the Danube. There are several internationally popular music festivals held in Serbia, such as EXIT (with 25–30,000 foreign visitors coming from 60 countries) and the Guča trumpet festival.

Transport

Serbia has a strategic transportation location since the country's backbone, Morava Valley, represents by far the easiest route of land travel from continental Europe to Asia Minor and the Near East.

Serbian road network carries the bulk of traffic in the country. Total length of roads is 45,419 km of which 915 km are "class-Ia state roads" (i.e. motorways); 4,481 km are "class-Ib state roads" (national roads); 10,941 km are "class-II state roads" (regional roads) and 23,780 km are "municipal roads". The road network, except for the most of class-Ia roads, are of comparatively high quality to the Western European standards because of huge financial investments Serbias has been seeing in the last 10 years.

Over 300 kilometers of new motorways has been constructed in the last decade and additional 142 kilometers are currently under construction: A5 motorway (from north of Kruševac to Čačak) and 30 km-long segment of A2 (between Čačak and Požega). Coach transport is very extensive: almost every place in the country is connected by bus, from largest cities to the villages; in addition there are international routes (mainly to countries of Western Europe with small Serb diaspora). Routes, both domestic and international, are served by more than 100 bus companies, biggest of which are Lasta and Niš-Ekspres. , there were 1,959,584 registered passenger cars or 1 passenger car per 3.5 inhabitants.

Serbia has 3,819 kilometers of rail tracks, of which 1,279 are electrified and 283 kilometers are double-track railroad. The major rail hub is Belgrade (and to a lesser degree Niš), while the most important railroads include: Belgrade–Bar (Montenegro), Belgrade–Šid–Zagreb (Croatia)/Belgrade–Niš–Sofia (Bulgaria) (part of Pan-European Corridor X), Belgrade–Subotica–Budapest (Hungary) and Niš–Thessaloniki (Greece). Although still a major mode of freight transportation, railroads face increasing problems with the maintenance of the infrastructure and lowering speeds. The rail services are operated by Srbija Voz (passenger transport) and Srbija Kargo (freight transport).

There are three airports with regular passenger traffic. Belgrade Nikola Tesla Airport served 5.6 million passengers in 2018 and is a hub of flagship carrier Air Serbia which carried some 2.5 million passengers in 2018. Niš Constantine the Great Airport is mainly catering low-cost airlines. Morava Airport is currently only served by Air Serbia.

Serbia has a developed inland water transport since there are 1,716 kilometers of navigable inland waterways (1,043 km of navigable rivers and 673 km of navigable canals), which are almost all located in northern third of the country. The most important inland waterway is the Danube (part of Pan-European Corridor VII). Other navigable rivers include Sava, Tisza, Begej and Timiş River, all of which connect Serbia with Northern and Western Europe through the Rhine–Main–Danube Canal and North Sea route, to Central Europe via the Tisza, Begej and Danube Black Sea routes, and to Southern Europe via the Sava river. More than 2 million tons of cargo were transported on Serbian rivers and canals in 2016 while the largest river ports are: Novi Sad, Belgrade, Pančevo, Smederevo, Prahovo and Šabac.

Economic indicators

The following table shows the main economic indicators

Labour

In 2021, the labour force was estimated at  3.201 million and employment stood at 2.848 million persons (formal employment amounted to 2.473 million while informal was at 0.375 million). Employment rate (among population aged 15 and over) is comparatively low and stood at 48.6%; of those employed; of those employed 15.9 worked in agriculture, 28.1% in industry, and 56% in services in 2018. The unemployment rate has been in double digits throughout the post-socialist era, reaching its peak at 25.9% in 2012. Since then, the rate has decreased substantially, with the creation of new jobs in primarily private sector, reaching 9.8% in 2021.

According to the latest monthly report of the Statistical Office of the Republic of Serbia, the average monthly salary in January 2022 amounted to 120,085 Serbian dinars (1,022 euros) gross or 85,422 Serbian dinars (727 euros) net. The median salary amounted to 85,422 Serbian dinars (727 euros) gross or 64,860 (552 euros) net, which means that 50% of the employees had earned a salary up to that amount.

The employer is also liable to pay for additional social security contributions which brings the total labour cost for the average salary to 139,832 Serbian dinars (1,188 euros), thus the total tax ratio amounts to 37.6%.    The map below shows average salaries by region in December 2022, expressed in gross terms in order to make the data comparable to the data that is published by Eurostat. Due to the nature of Serbia's economy, the majority of people working in Serbia work under the so-called "entrepreneurship" salary. This category of worker is seen in local markets, for examples, plumbers, and a variety of occupations. The majority of people working in the IT are also entrepreneurs, and entrepreneurs' tax contribution will not exceed the maximum amount of 10% of their salary. The average tax contribution is from €80 to €250 a month (depending on the location registered in Serbia), which is between 0.0042% to 2% of tax when compared to the max amount of income allowed under the entrepreneurship bracket. This makes Serbia one of the best countries for entrepreneurship in Europe, with lowest income tax rate in Europe.

Regional economies
The list includes statistical regions of Serbia by GDP, share of total GDP and GDP per capita & average gross salary in 2019:

Companies

The list includes ten largest Serbian companies by revenue in 2020 (revenue and employees figures without subsidiaries):

The list includes ten largest Serbian companies by net income in 2018 (net income and employees figures without subsidiaries):

See also
National Bank of Serbia
List of banks in Serbia
List of companies of Serbia
Belgrade Stock Exchange

References

Further reading

External links

 Serbia Investment and Export Promotion Agency
 Serbian Chamber of Commerce
 National Bank of Serbia
 Belgrade Stock Exchange

 
Serbia
Serbia